Obiageli, short for Oby is a traditional female given name used by the Igbo people of Nigeria. It means "One who is born to eat wealth".

Notable people with the name include:
Oby Ezekwesili, Chartered accountant and politician
Obigeli Olorunsola, Badminton player
 Oby Kechere, Actress and film director
 Oby Onyioha, Singer and songwriter

References

Igbo given names